Guttiner Heider Fernando Costa Tenorio (born 6 October 1994), commonly known as Gucci, is a Brazilian professional footballer who most recently played as a midfielder for Stomil Olsztyn.

Career
Guttiner is a player who started in the basic categories of América Futebol Clube (Belo Horizonte) (MG) and began his professional career at Bonsucesso Futebol Clube, played in Associação Acadêmica e Desportiva Vitória das Tabocas (Recife).

In July 2017, he signed a two-and-half years deal with the Ukrainian Premier League's FC Olimpik Donetsk. In December, 2017 contract was terminated and he left Ukrainian club. In February 2018 Guttiner signed for fellow Ukrainian Premier League side Chornomorets Odesa.

References

External links
Guttiner at playmakerstats.com (English version of ogol.com.br)

Site http://guttiner.wixsite.com/guttiner

1994 births
Living people
Footballers from São Paulo
Brazilian footballers
Association football midfielders
Brazilian expatriate footballers
Brazilian expatriate sportspeople in Ukraine
Brazilian expatriate sportspeople in the Czech Republic
Brazilian expatriate sportspeople in Poland
Brazilian expatriate sportspeople in Malta
Expatriate footballers in Ukraine
Expatriate footballers in the Czech Republic
Expatriate footballers in Poland
Expatriate footballers in Malta
FC Olimpik Donetsk players
Ukrainian Premier League players
Ukrainian First League players
I liga players
Bonsucesso Futebol Clube players
Clube Atlético Linense players
FC Chornomorets Odesa players
Hibernians F.C. players
FC Obolon-Brovar Kyiv players
FK Viktoria Žižkov players
FC Kramatorsk players
Navbahor Namangan players
OKS Stomil Olsztyn players